During the 2007–08 English football season, Swansea City competed in Football League One.

Season summary
Swansea finished the season as champions of League One, ten points ahead of runners-up Nottingham Forest. Swansea had flirted with the top six for the first third of the season, before a run of six straight wins lifted them to first place, which they did not relinquish for the rest of the season. This winning sequence was the start of eighteen straight matches without defeat. The club also enjoyed good form in the Football League Trophy, reaching the Southern finals before being knocked out by Milton Keynes Dons in a penalty shootout.

Squad
Squad at end of season

Left club during season

Reserve squad

Notes

References

2007-08
2007–08 Football League One by team
Welsh football clubs 2007–08 season